Tropiocolotes chirioi is a species of gecko of the family Gekkonidae. It is found in the Sahara Desert.

References

chirioi
Geckos of Africa
Reptiles of North Africa
Reptiles described in 2022